Jeevithe Lassanai is a 2012 Sri Lankan Sinhala comedy film directed by Sudesh Wasantha Peris and produced by Sunil T Fernando for Sunil T Films. It stars Ranjan Ramanayake, Tennyson Cooray and Ananda Wickramage in lead roles along with Maheshi Madusanka and Anton Jude. Music composed by Asela Endralal.

Plot
A wealthy businessman Aaron Mudalali (Ananda) has four uncontrollable daughters, named : Dinethra (Maheshi), Subodhani (Menaka), Devumini (Nethu), and Kavya (Ruwangi), who refuse to be disciplined, and be married due to several opinions and attitudes. One day, a wealthy young man Wishwa (Ranjan) who is in love with youngest daughter Kavya arrives to Mudalali's house and asked him to give permission to marry her. But, mudalali refuses it and said that it has been said that, he must marry all four daughters at the same time at same wedding, unless he will die soon. So, mudalali hand over Wishwa to locate three other grooms for his three daughters also, otherwise no marriage will take place. With all four refusing to marry anyone where they have several problems with boys.

Eldest daughter, Dinethra is a kind hearted girl with all her life devoted to library and books. Wishwa tried to match her with his best friend Kukula (Tennyson) and Kukula involve in many incidents to success his love. Second eldest Subodhani already loves a guy, but he has another girl, so she said that she only marry him, otherwise no more weddings take place. Wishwa and Kukula started to break her fiancée and make the relationship between Prabodhi and him. Third eldest Devumini is completely different from all three. She is tough looking and will only marry a boy if he agrees to obey four rules. These rules are;
 The parents of the boy should be dead.
 The boy should have a good cooking ability.
 The boy should have a degree.
 The boy should give the permission to her to become an actress.

With all these rules, its getting hard to find a boy who obey these rules. After several unsuccessful boys, Wishwa found a salesman B.A. Chakrawarthi (Chathura), who agrees to obey any rule, even more than four, if he gets to marry Devumi. Finally, Wishwa has found four boys including him for the four girls and marriage was confirmed.

Cast
 Ranjan Ramanayake as Wishwa (U.N.P. Wishwa)
 Tennyson Cooray as Kalyana / Ku.Ku.La (Kude Kudu Laos)
 Ananda Wickramage as Aaron Mudalali (J.V.P. Aaron)
 Chathura Perera as B.A. Chakrawarthi
 Ruwangi Rathnayake as Kavya
 Maheshi Madusanka as Dinethra
 Nethu Priyangika as Devumini
 Menaka Madhuwanthi as Subodhani
 Robin Fernando as Mr. Wijenayake
 Wilson Gunaratne as Jayasundara
 Anton Jude as Popa
 Wasantha Kumaravila as Anton
 Hemantha Eriyagama as Punchi baba
 Tyrone Michael
 Susila Kottage as Umma devi
 Vinoja Nilanthi as Sylvia
 Kapila Sigera as Police inspector
 Imalsha Madushani as Disco girl
 Sahan Wijesinghe
 Premadasa Vithanage

References

2012 comedy films
2012 films
Sinhala-language films
Films shot in Sri Lanka